Juan Tamad is a Philippine television situational comedy series broadcast by GMA Network. Directed by Soxie Topacio, it stars Sef Cadayona in the title role. It premiered on August 23, 2015 replacing Alamat. The series concluded on March 13, 2016 with a total of 29 episodes.

Cast and characters

Lead cast
 Sef Cadayona as Juan Damat-Magbangon

Supporting cast
 Max Collins as Marie Guiguinto
 Melanie Marquez as Candy Guiginto
 Carlos Agassi as Iggy Imperial
 Roi Vinzon as George Damat-Magbangon
 Marissa Sanchez as Siony Damat-Magbangon
 Gene Padilla as Steve Guiguinto
 Gab Bayan as Rocco Nachino
 Jon Timmons as TomDen Rodriguez
 Jhaykien Nuyad as Bernardo "Nards" Carpio
 Tommy Peñaflor as Mark Rehas
Kim Last as Jepoy Bagalihog

Guest cast
 Valeen Montenegro as Mayumi
 Kim Rodriguez as Diw Diwata
 Jaclyn Jose as a recruiter 
 Betong Sumaya as Guapple

Ratings
According to AGB Nielsen Philippines' Mega Manila household television ratings, the pilot episode of Juan Tamad earned a 22.2% rating. While the final episode scored a 10.6% rating.

References

External links
 

2015 Philippine television series debuts
2016 Philippine television series endings
Filipino-language television shows
GMA Network original programming
GMA Integrated News and Public Affairs shows
Philippine comedy television series
Television shows set in the Philippines